Seun Sean Jimoh  is an American based Nigerian actor.

Personal life
On 7 January 2017, Seun married Olatokunbo Morafa Jimoh. On 22 May 2019, via an Instagram post, he announced the arrival of his second child.

Career
In 2007, he got his first supporting role as an actor on the Nigeria Yoruba soap opera "Kilanta", a family television sitcom showing on Africa Magic Yoruba, and Super Story, a family television drama series.  He came into prominence in 2015, with a lead role on A Long Night, and The Ex (II), which also landed him an award at the 2016 Best of Nollywood Awards as the Revelation of the Year (male). In 2019, Seun Sean Jimoh produced his first movie titled "A Tale of Two Brothers" under Flintstone Pictures production, and on the 18th of October 2019, it was premiered in cinemas nationwide, starring Adeniyi Johnson, Sophie Alakija, Bolanle Ninalowo, and Skiibii as the main cast of the action drama.

Filmography

Awards and nominations

References

External links
 

Living people
Yoruba male actors
Nigerian male film actors
Male actors in Yoruba cinema
21st-century Nigerian male actors
Year of birth missing (living people)
Nigerian male television actors